The 2016 London Assembly election was an election held on 5 May 2016 to elect the members of the London Assembly. It took place on the same day as the London mayoral election and the United Kingdom local elections. Four parties had AMs in the previous Assembly: London Labour led by Len Duvall, London Conservatives led by Gareth Bacon, London Greens led by Siân Berry, and the London Liberal Democrats led by Caroline Pidgeon.

Labour received the largest number of votes ever cast for a party in a London Assembly election, becoming the first party to poll over 1 million votes. Although they gained Merton and Wandsworth from the Conservatives, their regional vote share declined by 0.8%, and they finished with 12 AMs, the same as in 2012. The Conservative Party won just 8 Assembly seats, its worst-ever performance in a London Assembly election. The Green Party retained its 2 Assembly members, although its 8.0% share of the regional vote represented its worst-ever result, and UKIP returned to the London Assembly for the first time since the election of 2004. The Liberal Democrats elected just 1 AM, their worst-ever result.

Of the minor parties, the newly formed Women's Equality Party was the most successful, attracting 91,772 votes (3.51%) on the regional list, which did not entitle them to any Assembly members as the threshold for representation is 5% of the regional vote. No other party polled above 2%.

Overview
The election system used is called the Additional Member System. There are 14 constituencies that elect one member each to the Assembly. These seats have been won only by the Labour Party or the Conservative Party. The remaining 11 seats are distributed by a second vote, by a modified D'Hondt method of closed-list voting, with a 5% minimum threshold. These seats have been won by other parties too, namely the Green Party, the Liberal Democrats and UKIP, and in the past the British National Party. The overall result is an attempted compromise between constituency representation and London-wide proportional representation.

Those who were eligible had to be registered to vote before 19 April 2016 in order to take part in this election.

Candidates

Constituency candidates

List candidates

Rejected ballots 29,733 (1.1%)

Total votes 2,645,409

Note that party descriptions can be used as alternatives to the registered party name. Descriptions used in this election were:
 Britain First – Putting British people first
 Caroline Pidgeon's London Liberal Democrats
 Green Party – "vote Green on orange"
 Respect (George Galloway)
 UK Independence Party (UKIP)
 The House Party – Homes for Londoners

Opinion polls

Constituency

Regional list

Results

|-
!rowspan=3 colspan=2 | Parties
!colspan=10 | Additional member system
!rowspan=2 colspan=5 | Total seats
|-
!colspan=5 |Constituency
!colspan=5 |Region
|-
! Votes !! % !! +/− !! Seats !! +/− 
! Votes !! % !! +/− !! Seats !! +/−
! Total !! +/− !! %
|-

|-
! style="background-color: Orange |
| style="text-align:left;" | All People's Party
| style="text-align:right;" | 6,991
| style="text-align:right;" | 0.3
| style="text-align:right;" | New
| style="text-align:right;" | 0
| style="text-align:right;" | 
| style="text-align:right;" | -
| style="text-align:right;" | -
| style="text-align:right;" | -
| style="text-align:right;" | -
| style="text-align:right;" | -
| style="text-align:right;" | 0
| style="text-align:right;" | 
| style="text-align:right;" | -
|-

|-
|   || Total || 2,614,862 ||  ||  || 14 ||   || 2,615,676 ||  ||  || 11 ||  || 25 ||   ||
|}

Footnotes

See also 
 2016 London mayoral election
 London Assembly
 List of London Assembly constituencies

References

External links
 London Elects homepage

London Assembly election
2016
Assembly election
London Assembly election
London Assembly election